Lancashire Constabulary is the territorial police force responsible for policing the ceremonial county of Lancashire in North West England. The force's headquarters are at Hutton, near the city of Preston. , the force has 3,088 police officers, 190 special constables, and 280 police community support officers (PCSO), 300 police support volunteers (PSV), and 2,287 staff.

History
After many complaints over a number of years over the crime ridden state of Lancashire, it was decided in 1839 that a combined county police force was required to police the county. In the same year the force was founded and Captain John Woodford was made chief constable with two assistant chief constables, 14 superintendents and 660 constables.

Over the next 50 years, the police force saw many changes including the introduction of the police helmet and, during the 1860s, the force lost its first officer, PC Jump, who died after being shot by a group of men that he and a colleague were searching. By the end of the century the force had developed a detective department who were allowed to wear plain clothes. The first detective appointed was John Wallbank.

In 1917, the force first allowed female officers although it was only in the 1950s that they were allowed uniforms, and not until the 1970s were they paid at the same rate as their male counterparts. In 1948 the force's dog section was established with many differing breeds being used, but by the 1950s it was established that the German shepherd was the most suitable.

In 1965, the force had an establishment of 3,784 officers and an actual strength of 3,454, making it the second largest police force (after the Metropolitan Police) and the largest county force in Great Britain.

The force then went through major changes in the 1970s, when the force was reduced to cover the new re-bordered Lancashire with the other areas coming under the jurisdiction of Greater Manchester Police and Merseyside Police.

On 10 October 2007, the Home Office announced that Lancashire Constabulary had ranked joint first, with Surrey, out of 43 forces by Her Majesty's Inspectorate of Constabularies.  All 43 police forces were assessed on seven areas - tackling crime, serious crime, protecting vulnerable people, satisfaction, neighbourhood policing, local priorities and resources and efficiency.

Proposed merger 
Under proposals made by the home secretary on 6 February 2006, it was to be merged with Cumbria Constabulary.  These were accepted by both forces on 26 February, and the merger would have taken place on 1 April 2007. However, in July 2006, both Cumbria and Lancashire constabularies decided not to proceed with the merger because the government failed to remedy issues with the council tax precept which left both forces unable to proceed.

Chief Constables
18391856: John Woodford
18591868: William P. Elgee
18681876: Colonel Robert Bruce
18771880: Charles Legge
18801909: Henry Martin Moorsom
?1912: Charles Villiers Ibbetson
19121927: Sir Philip Lane
19271935: Wilfred Trubshaw
19351950: Archibald Frederick Hordern
19501967: Sir Eric St Johnston (Chief Inspector of Constabulary, 1967–1970)
19671972: William Palfrey 
?19721977: Stanley Parr (dismissed for disreputable conduct)
1978?1983: Albert Laugharne
19831995: Robert Brian Johnson
19952002: Pauline Clare
20022005: Paul Stephenson
20052017: Stephen Finnigan
20172021: Andy Rhodes
2021present: Chris Rowley

Officers killed in the line of duty

The Police Roll of Honour Trust and Police Memorial Trust list and commemorate all British police officers killed in the line of duty. Since its establishment in 1984, the Police Memorial Trust has erected 50 memorials nationally to some of those officers.

The following officers of Lancashire Constabulary are listed by the trust as having died attempting to prevent, stop or solve a crime:
PC Peter Burnett, 1990 (collapsed and died attempting to disperse rioters)
PC Ian Wain Woodward, 1987 (shot dead)
Acting Sgt Walter Lacey, 1978 (collapsed and died attempting to arrest a suspect)
Supt Gerry Richardson, 1971 (shot dead attempting to arrest a gunman who had shot a fellow officer; posthumously awarded the George Cross)
PC Ernest Southern, 1962 (collapsed and died attending a street affray)
DI James O'Donnell, 1958 (shot dead attempting to arrest a gunman who had shot two others; posthumously awarded the Queen's Police Medal)
PC Sydney Arthur Tysoe, 1949 (died from injuries sustained during an arrest in 1940)
War Reserve Constable John Towers, 1943 (died from injuries sustained in an assault)
PC Stewart Mungo Whillis, 1907 (died from injuries sustained in an assault in 1901)
PC Nicholas Cock, 1876 (fatally shot arresting armed burglars)
PC William Jump, 1862 (shot dead attempting to arrest an armed gang)

Divisions and collaborations 

The force is split into 5 divisions, three geographical and two based at the force HQ at Hutton. The split is approximate, and divisions are deliberately vague, giving a seamless approach to policing in the Lancashire area. The geographical divisions and their headquarters are as follows:

Western 
The headquarters are in Blackpool from where this division is responsible for the Fylde area stretching from Bispham down to Kirkham. Lancaster is also assigned with the policing of Morecambe, Heysham and the Wyre area. A new divisional HQ was opened in 2018.

Southern
The headquarters are in Lancaster Road, Preston, with a secondary base at Chorley Magistrates' Court: it polices the Preston, South Ribble, Chorley and West Lancashire areas.

Eastern 
Based at Greenbank, Blackburn, this division is primarily assigned to police the Blackburn with Darwen, Ribble Valley and Accrington, Burnley, Pendle and Rossendale areas.

G Division
Headquarters; encompassing the Force Intelligence Department (F.I.D), Serious Organised Crime Unit (S.O.C.U) and Special Branch (S.B).

H Division
Operations Support and Operations Planning, which encompasses Motorway, Armed Response, Air Support, Mounted and various other functions.

Lancashire Constabulary partners with the North West Police Underwater Search & Marine Unit and the North West Motorway Police Group.

TacOps
At the end of 2017 Lancashire Constabulary formed the Tactical Operations Team (TacOps for short) which is composed of the Roads Policing Unit, Dog Unit, Mounted Branch, Armed Response Unit and Operational Support Unit.

Police stations 
The constabulary has 36 full-time stations across the county with over 100 further police posts and smaller village stations. Although the county has this large number of stations less than half have adequate provisions to hold prisoners.

The training of student officers is undertaken at police headquarters (Hutton). In addition, specialist training and certain specialist units such as the dog section and mounted department are based at the force's HQ at Hutton.

Equipment
The routine patrol officer is not armed but does carry a baton, an incapacitant spray, limb restraints (leg restraints), a first aid kit, a torch and rigid handcuffs. All police officers, special constables, PCSOs and civilian members of staff are required to wear a stab vest when on duty and "not in an office environment"; most choose to wear their vest at all times. Lancashire Constabulary issues black stab vests made by German manufacturer "Mehler Vario Systems". Although officers are not routinely armed, many response and neighbourhood policing officers are now trained in the use of taser guns and routinely carry them whilst on patrol. Lancashire also has several Armed Response teams carrying assault rifles, pistols and taser guns.

In September 2014, the force rolled out the use of 150 body-mounted cameras, for officers in 'response' roles, following a successful pilot scheme. All officers are now trained to use them and many choose to use them on every shift. However it is not mandatory for officers to wear them at all times.

All officers also carry two-way radios registered to Airwave Solutions, a nationwide radio network in the UK on which police and other emergency rely. Based on the TETRA standard, the radio network is secure and fully protected against eavesdropping on transmissions, as well as allowing interoperability with other police services, fire brigades, as well as ambulance services.

Motorway unit

The force's motorway policing unit has headquarters at Samlesbury near Preston. The unit is led by a single inspector who in turn is responsible for seven sergeants and 43 police constables. The unit also operates a vehicle checking station at Cuerden between Chorley and Preston on the M65, this is done in co-operation with VOSA.

Until 2018, Lancashire's motorway unit was one of the four forces that make up the North West Motorway Police Group along with Merseyside Police, Greater Manchester Police and Cheshire Constabulary.

Air Support Unit
Since 2013, air support has been provided by the National Police Air Service, which provides air support to all police forces in England & Wales.

This now-defunct unit operated an EC135 helicopter based at BAE Warton. The force had an ASU since 1994 when it fielded a Eurocopter Squirrel, but this was retired in the early 2000s as it was replaced by the newer EC135.

Firearms unit
Due to police officers in the county not being routinely armed the force has its own specialised firearms unit based at locations around the county. The force has at any one time nine armed officers on patrol. As well being trained in firearms, AFOs are also trained in other skills such as method of entry and advanced pursuit tactics.

PEEL inspection
His Majesty's Inspectorate of Constabulary and Fire & Rescue Services (HMICFRS) conducts a periodic police effectiveness, efficiency and legitimacy (PEEL) inspection of each police service's performance. In its latest PEEL inspection, Lancashire Constabulary was rated as follows:

See also
Lancashire Police and Crime Commissioner
Policing in the United Kingdom
GRIP (Group Intervention Panel)
Operation Tremor
Road Policing Unit
Lancashire Fire and Rescue Service
Lancashire Probation Trust
British Transport Police

References

External links

 Lancashire Constabulary at HMICFRS
Lancashire Partnership Against Crime
Lancashire Constabulary Roll of Honour

Police forces of England
Constabulary
Government agencies established in 1839
1839 establishments in England